Carlotta Gilli (born 13 January 2001) is a partially sighted Italian Paralympic swimmer who competes in international level events. She holds twelve world records in her class. She won five medals at the 2020 Summer Paralympics.

Biography 
She studied at the University of Turin. She competed at the 2017 World Para Swimming Championships.

Achievements

Records 
Gilli is the holder of 7 world records in the long course, 5 world records in the short course, and 2 European records in the long course:

World record in long course 
 50 freestyle 26”67 (Trophy Sette Colli, Roma 29/6/2018)
 100 backstroke 1’05”76  (European Championships Dublin 17/8/2018)
 100 butterfly 1’02”22 (World Series Lignano Sabbiadoro 27/5/2018)
 100 freestyle 57”34 (Trophy Sette Colli, Roma 30/6/2018)
 50 butterfly 27”98 (IDM Berlin 9/7/2017)
 200 butterfly 2’24”07 (Trophy Sette Colli, Roma 1/7/2018)
 400 Mixed 5’08”86 (IDM Berlin 7/6/2018)

European record in long course 
 200 freestyle 2’08”01 (Trophy Sette Colli, Roma 23/6/2018)
 200 mixed 2’22”12 (European Championships Dublin  15/8/2018)

World record in short course 
 100 freestyle  59”30  (Italian Championships FINP, Loano, 2/12/2018)
 100 butterfly  1’03”92  (Italian Championships FINP, Loano, 2/12/2018)
 100 backstroke  1’06”44  (Italian Championships FINP, Portici, 30/11/2019)
 50 freestyle  27”07  (Italian Championships FINP, Portici, 30/11/2019)
 50 butterfly  29”43  (Italian Championships FINP, Portici, 30/11/2019)

See also
 Italy at the 2020 Summer Paralympics - Medalists

References

External links 
 
 

2001 births
Living people
Sportspeople from Turin
Paralympic swimmers of Italy
Medalists at the World Para Swimming Championships
Medalists at the World Para Swimming European Championships
Swimmers at the 2020 Summer Paralympics
Medalists at the 2020 Summer Paralympics
Paralympic medalists in swimming
Paralympic gold medalists for Italy
Paralympic silver medalists for Italy
Paralympic bronze medalists for Italy
Paralympic athletes of Fiamme Oro
Italian female freestyle swimmers
Italian female backstroke swimmers
Italian female medley swimmers
Italian female butterfly swimmers
S13-classified Paralympic swimmers
21st-century Italian women